Greenham Common Women's Peace Camp was a series of protest camps established to protest against nuclear weapons being placed at RAF Greenham Common in Berkshire, England. The camp began on 5 September 1981 after a Welsh group, Women for Life on Earth, arrived at Greenham to protest against the decision of the British government to allow cruise missiles to be stored there. After realising that the march alone was not going to get them the attention that they needed to have the missiles removed, women began to stay at Greenham to continue their protest. The first blockade of the base occurred in March 1982 with 250 women protesting, during which 34 arrests and one death occurred. The camp was brought to a close in 2000 to make way for the Commemorative and Historic Site on the land that housed the original Women's Peace Camp at Yellow Gate Greenham Common between the years 1981 and 2000.

History
In September 1981, 36 women chained themselves to the base fence in protest against nuclear weapons. On 29 September 1982, the women were evicted by Newbury District Council but set up a new camp nearby within days. In December 1982, 30,000 women joined hands around the base at the Embrace the Base event, in response to the third anniversary of NATO's decision to house nuclear missiles on British soil. The daringness and creativity of the Greenham women was reflected when a small group climbed the fence to dance on missile silos that were under construction on New Year's Day 1983.

The camps became well-known when on 1 April 1983, about 70,000 protesters formed a  human chain from Greenham to Aldermaston and the ordnance factory at Burghfield. The media attention surrounding the camp inspired people across Europe to create other peace camps. Another encircling of the base occurred in December 1983, with 50,000 women attending. Sections of the fence were cut and there were hundreds of arrests.

On 4 April 1984, the women were again evicted from the Common; again, by nightfall many had returned to reform the camp. In January 1987, although Parliament had been told that there were no longer any women at Greenham, small groups of women cut down parts of the perimeter fence at Greenham Common every night for a week.

The protestors consisted of nine smaller camps at various gates around the base. Camps were named after the colours of the rainbow, as a way of contrasting against the green shades of the base. The first camp was called Yellow Gate, and others included Blue Gate with its New Age focus; Violet Gate with a religious focus; and Green Gate, which was women-only and did not accept male visitors.

The last missiles left the base in 1991 as a result of the Intermediate-Range Nuclear Forces Treaty, but the camp remained in place until 2000, after protesters won the right to house a memorial on the site. Although the missiles had been removed from the base, the camp was continued as part of the protest against the forthcoming UK Trident programme. Sarah Hipperson, who had been a part of the protest for all nineteen of its years, was among the last four women to leave the camp.
The old camp was inaugurated as a Commemorative and Historic Site on 5 October 2002. There are seven standing stones encircling the "Flame" sculpture representing a campfire. Next to this there is a stone and steel spiral sculpture, engraved with the words "You can't kill the Spirit". There is also a plaque there for activist Helen Wyn Thomas, who was killed near the site. The site has since been given to the Greenham Common Trust to care for.

Local and national opposition to the Peace Camp 
The Greenham women knew that their actions and presence were not entirely welcome. In an article Anne Seller, one of the Greenham women, remarked that the local pubs around Greenham refused to serve the women. People opposed to the protest would often meet in such places to think up ways of disrupting their activities. "Vigilante groups" would form to attack the women, noted Seller, making many of them afraid to venture into the town.

Neither were the local police friendly toward the protestors. Often police officers would release detained Greenham women in the middle of the night and if they drove them back to the base, would drop them off far from any established camp. The women were forced to walk long distances to rejoin the protest.

The Greenham women also experienced opposition from a local group by the name of Ratepayers Against the Greenham Encampments, RAGE, who were shopkeepers, businessmen, former military officers, retired professionals and local housewives from Newbury who disagreed with the peace camps. Along with a local branch of Women and Families for Defence, the opposition groups would campaign in Newbury with slogans such as: "Peace Women: You Disgust Us" and "Clean Up and Get Out". RAGE aimed to use local opinion and government to remove the Greenham women protesters, claiming they lured in illegal immigrants as well as did not represent a real concern for humanity and the future generations, because they left their children at home and were considered naive children who did not understand the problems of international defence.

The Ministry of Defence called for an increased police presence at the base. Terrorists might be trying to infiltrate the base, the ministry claimed, pretending to be Greenham protesters. The Greenham women saw this as one more attempt to hinder their protest. The British government also enacted a set of by-laws in an effort to end the Peace Encampment at Greenham Common, which made it illegal to enter the base without permission, and sent hundreds of women to prison for criminal trespass in Spring 1985. These by-laws were deemed unlawful in 1990 by the House of Lords, which was a monumental victory for the Greenham women.

Some feminists opposed the disarmament movement, claiming there were more important issues to address at home. The opposition came from the idea that women should try to focus on the issues in their daily lives such as health and work instead of dedicating the time it takes to dismantle the patriarchy at the top. It was difficult to justify protesting nuclear weapons when equal rights within the home did not exist. Men were allowed to participate in the protests if invited by women, causing the women opposed to the protests to dislike the movement more. Women questioned if the disarmament protests were true feminist movements if men were allowed in the space, and it caused women to not take the protests as legitimate because they did not think a true feminist movement needed men to make a statement.

Protest strategies 
The women at Greenham used actions, posters, and songs to protest against the nuclear missiles and gain attention.

The first protest action undertaken at Greenham involved women chaining themselves to the fence of the base in September 1981. The most well-known protest actions that the Greenham women undertook were the Embrace the Base event and their human chain protests. At Embrace the Base, 30,000 women held hands around the perimeter fence. In April 1983, the Greenham women and their supporters created a 14-mile human chain.  In late October 1983, the Greenham women arranged an action to take down the perimeter fence, which was described in the press release as "our Berlin Wall", where about four of the nine miles of perimeter fence were cut down. By using a distraction of dressing up as witches to fake their partaking in a Greenham Halloween party, the women were able to prevent the police from suspecting the cutting of the fence before it happened. In December of that year, another human chain was created, circling around the fence, while some parts of the fence were cut.

The Greenham women would often 'keen'. They would dress in black, and say that they were mourning for children who would be lost to nuclear war in the future.

Posters were used by the women at Greenham, and often featured the symbol of a spider web, meant to symbolise the fragility and perseverance of the Greenham women.

Singing was another protest strategy used by the Greenham women. Popular songs were sometimes used with their lyrics rewritten to support the anti-nuclear cause. Some of the songs were original, written by the women of the camps. In 1988, "Greenham Women Are Everywhere", the official songbook of the camp, was published.

Importance of gender
In February 1982 it was decided that the protest should involve women only, which established it as the first and longest lasting peace encampment. This was important as the women were using their identity as mothers to legitimise the protest against nuclear weapons, all in the name of the safety of their children and future generations.

The spider web became one of the most-used symbols at the camp, because it is both fragile and resilient, as the Greenham women envisioned themselves. The Greenham women were notorious for dressing themselves up as witches in order to contrast the symbol of the evil witch with the actions of ordinary women at the base.

There were several instances when women entered the camp, effectively entering a "male" space. On New Year's Eve 1982, the women broke into the base for the first time; 44 women climbed over the military base's fence and climbed on top of the silos and danced around on them for hours.  All the women were arrested, and 36 were imprisoned. On 1 April 1983, 200 women entered the base dressed as teddy bears. A "child" symbol like the teddy bear was a stark contrast to the highly militarised atmosphere of the base; the women again were highlighting the safety of their children and future generations of children.

The next major event was 'Reflect the Base' on 11 December 1983, when 50,000 women circled the base to protest against the cruise missiles which had arrived three weeks earlier. The day started as a silent vigil where women held up mirrors as to allow the base to symbolically look back at itself and its actions; however, the day ended with hundreds of arrests as the women pulled down large sections of the fence.

Upon breaching the barriers and entering the base, the women were making the statement that they would not stay at home and do nothing the way that women are traditionally expected to while the men take care of the serious "male" issues. Their refusal to go home at the end of each day was a challenge against the traditional notion that a woman's place was in the home. Many media outlets even questioned the behaviour of the Greenham women: if their children were so important to them, they asked, then why were they not home with them? The media tended to ignore the Greenham women's collective identity of "women as mothers" protecting the children and largely focused on the illegitimacy of the camp, describing it as a witches' coven laden with criminal activity, with the women posing a threat to family values and the state. One such part of the protest that the media ignored took place on 12 December 1982, where women hung pictures of their children on the fence. The idea surrounding this particular event was to hang representations of things the women loved on the fence; to many, this meant hanging pictures of their children. Candles were also brought to the protest to mourn the future of the children.

Aftermath 
In 2000, the fences surrounding the base were finally taken down. The site of the protests was turned into a memorial to honor the disarmament movement. The memorial consists of a garden with welsh stones surrounding it. The memorial is meant to show peace and the fight against nuclear weapons. The rest of the land has been given back to the people and the local council.

Related movements: the Moscow Trust Group and Window Peace (New York)
In May 1983 three women representing the Greenham Common Peace Camp (Karmen Cutler, Ann Pettitt, and US citizen Jean McCollister) flew to Moscow and met with the official Soviet Peace Committee and the unofficial "Group for Establishing Trust between the USSR and the USA". At the airport on 27 May the Moscow customs confiscated Jean McCollister's diary, which contained notes of her conversations with the Trust group.

The Greenham Common Women’s Peace Camp inspired related peace movements in the U.K. as well as abroad. One such movement was Window Peace, a year-long live-in performance art installation in New York City. As a tribute to the protestors of the original movement, who at the time had been living outside of the Greenham RAF camp, as well as to the Seneca Women's Peace Encampment, women artists and activists created a rotating series of art installations in the store SohoZat at 307 West Broadway in Manhattan.

The Window Peace installation, created in 1986 by artist Susan Kleckner, took place in the Soho Zat storefront, located in lower Manhattan. As had been the practice of the Greenham Common movement, only women artists could participate; however, men were allowed to participate if they had been invited by a woman. Each week for an entire year, beginning 12 December 1986 until 11 November 1987, 51 women artists occupied the storefront window with their art. Among the artists were Susan Kleckner (also the originator), Ann Snitow, Dianna Moonmade, Sharon Jaddis, Tequila Minsky, Anne Meiman, Carol Jacobsen, Joyce George, Jane Winter, Marsha Grant, The Women of the Greenham and Seneca Movements, Catherine Allport, Eileen Jones, Susann Ingle, Sharon Smith, Linda Montano, Dominque Mazur, Cenen, Pamela Schumaker, Judy Trupin, Connie Samaras, E.A. Racette, Peggey Lowenberg and Maggie Ens, Kathy Constantinides, Elaine Pratt, Coco Gordon, Sally Jacque, Kay Roberts, Anna Rubin, Renee Rockoff, Harriet Glazier, Karen Marshall, Paula Allen, and others.

See also

 Campaign for Nuclear Disarmament
 Faslane Peace Camp
 Helen John
 Helen Thomas
 List of peace activists
 Seneca Women's Encampment for a Future of Peace and Justice
 Women Strike for Peace
 List of women pacifists and peace activists

Related works

Primary sources 
Walking to Greenham, how the peacecamp began, by Ann Pettitt. Published by Honno.
 Greenham Women Are Everywhere, the official songbook of the Greenham Common Women's Peace Camp

Several sets of papers related to Greenham Common Women's Peace Camp are held at The Women's Library at the Library of the London School of Economics, including;

 Greenham Common Collection ref 5GCC
 Records of Greenham Common Women's Peace Camp (Yellow Gate) ref 5GCW
 Jayne and Juliet Nelson (Yellow Gate) ref 7JAN
The peace camp was also the subject of a 1983 documentary by Beeban Kidron and Amanda Richardson, Carry Greenham Home.

Secondary sources/anthologies 

Kerrow, Kate; Mordan, Rebecca (2021). Out of the Darkness: Greenham Voices 1981-2000. Foreword by Frankie Armstrong. The History Press.

Pettitt, Ann (2006). Walking to Greenham: How the peace camp began and the Cold War ended. Published by Honno.

Plays 

 Harrison,Tony.

Musicals 

 Beyond The Fence (2016) A wholly computer created musical in which computers scripted, scored, and provided lyrics to a musical about the Greenham Commons Women's Peace Camp.

Films 

 Mothers of the Revolution (2021) – documentary narrated by Glenda Jackson

Novels 

 
Davies, Stephanie (2020). Other Girls Like Me.  Bedazzled Ink Publishing LLC.  ISBN 978-1-949290-38-7 (pb)

References
FootnotesBibliography

External links
 Documentary from undercurrents about the march that started Greenham Common Women's Peace Camp
 Greenham Common Women's Peace Camp website
 Greenham Common Camp Festival website
 YourGreenham.co.uk, information about Greenham from The Guardian
 Article on Greenham Common Women’s Peace Camp by the International Museum of Women.
 The Greenham Common women's peace camp. BBC World Service - Witness History.
 Greenham Common Women’s Peace Camp changed the world – and my life by Jane Powell. Published by openDemocracy on 8 November 2021.
 How the Greenham Common protest changed lives: ‘We danced on top of the nuclear silos’. The Guardian. Authors - Suzanne Moore, Homa Khaleeli, Moya Sarner, Leah Harper and Justin McCurry. Published 20 March 2017.
 Remembering Greenham Common. New Statesman. Author - Kate Hudson. Published 18 April 2013.

Peace camps
Newbury, Berkshire
1981 establishments in England
1980s in England
1990s in England
2000 disestablishments in England
Protests in England
Political history of England
Pacifism in England
Intentional communities in the United Kingdom
Nonviolent occupation
Women in England
Cold War
Anti-nuclear movement in England
Anti-nuclear protests
History of Berkshire
Politics of Berkshire